Ostend is a coastal settlement in the English county of Norfolk. The population is included in the civil parish of Walcott.

It is between the towns of Cromer and Caister-on-Sea being south of, and contiguous with, Walcott.

Ostend achieved a degree of national notability in June 2002 when a rare specimen of Cuvier's beaked whale (Ziphius cavirostris) was stranded on its beach.

Notes

External links

External links

Villages in Norfolk
North Norfolk
Populated coastal places in Norfolk